Fabian Aichner (born 21 July 1990) is an Italian professional wrestler signed to WWE where he performs on SmackDown brand under the ring name Giovanni Vinci. He is a member of  Imperium.

Aichner previously worked on the U.S. independent circuit, including promotions such as Evolve, where he is a former Evolve Champion, as well as the European independent circuit under the ring name Adrian Severe.

Professional wrestling career

Early career (2011–2017)
Aichner made his professional wrestling debut on 12 December 2011 for New European Championship Wrestling (NEW). In 2012, Aichner competed in the finals of the NEW World Heavyweight Championship tournament but ultimately did not win the tournament nor the championship. In 2013, he once again reached in the finals of a NEW tournament, this time competing in the Deadline tournament but he once again would not win the tournament; the same would happen in the Deadline tournament in 2014. After his return to the independent circuit following the Cruiserweight Classic, Aichner would win the NEW World Tag Team Title Tournament with Mexx.

In 2014, Aichner defeated Chaos in the finals of the King of the North Tournament. At the end of this year Cagematch ranked him No. 5 for the Euro-Match des Jahres Cagematch Year End Awards.

In 2017, Aichner competed for the German Wrestling Federation (GWF) and the Belgian Flemish Wrestling Force (FWF).

WWE (2017–present) 

In June 2016, WWE announced Aichner as one of the 32 participants in the Cruiserweight Classic tournament. He was selected to represent Italy during the tournament. In the first round of the tournament, Aichner was eliminated by Gentleman Jack Gallagher.

On 5 June 2017 it was announced that Aichner had signed a contract with WWE. On June 22, Aichner performed at an NXT live event in a losing effort against Adrian Jaoude. It was later revealed that Aichner had gained almost 30 pounds of muscle since his appearance in the Cruiserweight Classic. He made his television debut on the September 27 episode of NXT, losing to Kassius Ohno. While being under contract with WWE, he made an appearance at Evolve 115 (which has WWE partnership), winning the Evolve Championship from Shane Strickland. At Evolve 116, he successfully defended the title against Kassius Ohno. However, he lost the title against Austin Theory at Evolve 117. 

Late in December, Aichner would form a team with Marcel Barthel, where they would compete on both the NXT and NXT UK brands. They would later align themselves with Walter and Alexander Wolfe, forming the stable Imperium. On May 13, 2020, Barthel and Aichner defeated Matt Riddle and Timothy Thatcher (a substitute for Pete Dunne) to win the NXT Tag team Championship. They would go on to successfully defend the titles against teams such as Oney Lorcan and Danny Burch, Breezango, and The Undisputed Era. On the August 26 episode of NXT, Imperium dropped the titles to Breezango ending their reign at 105 days. They failed to regain the titles from them in a rematch on the September 16 episode of NXT. On the special October 26, 2021 edition of NXT, Halloween Havoc, Barthel and Aichner would defeat MSK for the titles, signaling their second tag title victory. They would successfully defend their titles on the December 5 WarGames show against Kyle O'Reilly and Von Wagner.

On April 2, 2022 at NXT Stand & Deliver, Aichner and Barthel would lose the titles back to MSK in a triple threat tag team match also involving The Creed Brothers, ending their reign at 158 days. Aichner's final appearance as a member of Imperium was on the April 5 episode of NXT, when he and Barthel faced the Creed brothers in a losing effort. Aichner walked out on Barthel, signaling the break up of the tag team. This was later proven true, as Imperium would debut on SmackDown without Aichner. On the May 24 episode of NXT, vignettes aired promoting the debut of Aichner repackaged as Giovanni Vinci. He re-debuted on June 14 episode of NXT defeating Guru Raaj. On the August 16 NXT Heatwave special Vinci unsuccessfully challenged Carmelo Hayes for the NXT North American Championship.

On September 3, at Clash at the Castle 2022, Vinci appeared alongside Gunther and Ludwig Kaiser, with Kaiser announcing the reformation of Imperium.

Championships and accomplishments 
Championship of Wrestling
cOw Interstate Championship (1 time)
 Dansk Pro Wrestling
 King Of The North Tournament (2014)
Evolve
Evolve Championship (1 time)
New European Championship Wrestling
NEW Hardcore Championship (1 time)
NEW World Heavyweight Championship (2 times)
NEW World Tag Team Championship (1 time) – with Mexx
 Power of Wrestling
 POW Tag Team Championship (1 time) – with James Mason
Pro Wrestling Illustrated
Ranked No. 238 of the top 500 singles wrestlers on the PWI 500 in 2020
WWE
NXT Tag Team Championship (2 times) – with Marcel Barthel

References

External links 
 
 
 
 

1990 births
Living people
Sportspeople from Südtirol
Italian male professional wrestlers
People from Pfalzen
Germanophone Italian people
NXT Tag Team Champions
21st-century professional wrestlers